Zanabazar (meaning "Zanabazar") is a genus of large troodontid dinosaurs from the Late Cretaceous of Mongolia. The genus was originally named by Rinchen Barsbold as the new species Saurornithoides junior. In 2009 it was reclassified as its own genus and species, Zanabazar junior, named after the first spiritual figurehead of Tibetan buddhism, Zanabazar. The holotype includes a skull, vertebrae, and right hindlimb. Zanabazar was one of the largest and most derived troodontids.

History of discovery

The holotype was discovered in 1964 from the Bügiin Tsav locality of the Nemegt Formation and initially described by Rinchen Barsbold as a new species of Saurornithoides (S. junior) in 1974. This specimen, IGM 100/1, includes a nearly complete skull and braincase, part of the pelvis, some tail vertebrae, and parts of the right hindlimb. In 2009 a review of the genus found that the support for S. junior in the same genus as S. mongoliensis was lacking. Mark Norell and colleagues re-classified the species in the new genus Zanabazar, which they named in honor of Zanabazar, the first spiritual head (Bogd Gegen) of Tibetan Buddhism in Outer Mongolia.

Description

Zanabazar were large troodontids reaching  in length and weighing . The preserved vertebrae in IGM 100/1 are completely fused, indicating that this individual was an adult at the time of death.

Classification
While originally included in Saurornithoides, within the family Saurornithoididae, Zanabazar is now thought to be a derived member of Troodontidae.

 
The cladogram below shows the phylogenetic position of Zanabazar among other troodontids following a 2014 analysis.

See also

 Timeline of troodontid research

References

External links
 Skull of IGM 100/1 at Digimorph

Late Cretaceous dinosaurs of Asia
Troodontids
Fossil taxa described in 2009
Taxa named by Mark Norell
Taxa named by Rinchen Barsbold
Nemegt fauna